Joël Perrault (born April 6, 1983) is a Canadian former professional ice hockey centre who played a total of 96 games in the National Hockey League (NHL) throughout his playing career.

Playing career
Perrault was drafted by the Mighty Ducks of Anaheim in the fifth round, 137th overall, in the 2001 NHL Entry Draft. In his last year of junior hockey, Perrault was the QMJHL's leading scorer while playing for the Baie-Comeau Drakkar.

After turning professional, Perrault spent two seasons in the American Hockey League (AHL) with the Cincinnati Mighty Ducks and the Portland Pirates before he was traded to the Phoenix Coyotes in exchange for Sean O'Donnell on March 9, 2006.

In the 2006–07 season on October 31, 2006, St. Louis Blues claimed Perrault of waivers before being reclaimed by the Coyotes on December 19, 2006. He also spent parts of the season in the AHL with the San Antonio Rampage and the Blues' minor affiliate, the Peoria Rivermen.

In 2007–08, Perrault split time between the NHL and AHL scoring 17 points in 49 games for the Coyotes. Over the following two seasons, he remained in the Phoenix organization but was unable to establish a permanent role in the NHL, often relied on as an offensive contributor with San Antonio.

On May 11, 2010, Perrault signed with Swiss team EV Zug of the National League A (NLA). With the inclusion of an out clause for NHL interest, Perrault opted out with EV Zug and signed a one-year contract with the Vancouver Canucks on July 1, 2010.

Perrault began the 2010–11 season in the AHL. He played 15 games for the Canucks' top affiliate, the Manitoba Moose, before being recalled to the NHL to make his Vancouver debut on November 20 in a 7–1 home game against the Chicago Blackhawks.

On February 28, 2011, Perrault was traded (along with a third-round pick in the 2012 NHL Entry Draft) to the Anaheim Ducks in exchange for Maxim Lapierre and MacGregor Sharp.

On May 5, 2011, Perrault again signed in Switzerland, agreeing to a one-year and optional second year contract with the SCL Tigers beginning in the 2011–12 season. On November 18, he signed a one-year contract with HC Ambrì-Piotta for the remainder of the season.

On July 20, 2012, Perrault signed with HIFK of the Finnish SM-liiga for the 2012–13 season. Midway through the campaign, he determined his stay in Finland would be a solitary season after signing a contract for the following season with Krefeld Pinguine of the Deutsche Eishockey Liga (DEL) on December 10, 2013, also spending the 2014–15 season with the club.

In December 2015, Perrault signed with Dragons de Rouen of the French Ligue Magnus for the remainder of the 2015–16 season. He helped Rouen win the French championship, the French Cup competition as well as the IIHF Continental Cup. Perrault retired from professional hockey at the end of the season in March 2016.

Career statistics

Awards
2002–03 QMJHL First All-Star team
2002–03 QMJHL Jean Beliveau Trophy (Leading Scorer)
2002–03 QMJHL Michel Briere Trophy (MVP)
2002–03 CHL First All-Star team

References

External links

1983 births
Living people
HC Ambrì-Piotta players
Anaheim Ducks draft picks
Augusta Lynx players
Baie-Comeau Drakkar players
Canadian ice hockey centres
Cincinnati Mighty Ducks players
French Quebecers
HIFK (ice hockey) players
Krefeld Pinguine players
Manitoba Moose players
Peoria Rivermen (AHL) players
Phoenix Coyotes players
Portland Pirates players
St. Louis Blues players
San Antonio Rampage players
SCL Tigers players
Vancouver Canucks players
Ice hockey people from Montreal
Canadian expatriate ice hockey players in Finland
Canadian expatriate ice hockey players in Germany
Canadian expatriate ice hockey players in Switzerland